Pico do Roncador is the highest mountain of the Federal District, Brazil, reaching  above sea level. It is located to the northwest of Brasília.

References 

Mountains of Brazil
Highest points of Brazilian states